The Nigerian name Chioma may refer to:
 Chioma Agomo (born 1951), Nigerian law professor
 Chioma Ajunwa (born 1970), Nigerian Olympic athlete
 Chioma Chukwuka (born 1980), Nigerian actress
 Chioma Igwe (born 1986), American football (soccer) player
 Chioma Nnamaka (born 1985), Swedish basketball player
 Chioma Okoli, Nigerian actress
 Chioma Okoye (born 1983), Nigerian actress
 Chioma Omeruah, Nigerian actress
 Chioma Onyekwere (born 1994), American track-and-field athlete
 Chioma Opara (born 1951), Nigerian writer
 Chioma Toplis (born 1972), Nigerian actress
 Chioma Ubogagu (born 1992), British football (soccer) player
 Chioma Ude, Nigerian entertainment executive
 Chioma Udeaja (born 1984), Nigerian basketball player
 Chioma Wogu (born 1999), Nigerian football (soccer) player
 Kingsley Chioma (born 1984), Nigerian football (soccer) player

Nigerian feminine given names